John William Baker (March 10, 1781 - March 16, 1860), was an American merchant seaman who moved to Cuba and became a Spanish citizen. 

He was the son of Jacob Baker, a Philadelphia, Pennsylvania merchant, and his wife, Hannah Smith.  He moved to Trinidad, Cuba in 1805. and became wealthy through many businesses, including through landholdings, the slave trade and sugar plantations.  He became a naturalized Spanish citizen in 1819, and changed his name to Juan Guillermo Béquer.  He was later honored by Queen Isabel II of Spain with the honors of Caballero Gran Cruz de la Orden Americana de Isabel la Catolica, Gentilhombre de Camara con Estrada, Gran Cruz de Carlos III, Del Habito de Santiago, and a final title was pending prior to his death, which he consequently failed to receive as a result - Marques de San Juan de Piedras Albas. 

He built himself a mansion in Trinidad.  Legend says that he was so wealthy that when he tried to lay a mosaic of doubloons in the floor of the dining room, authorities pointed out it would be improper to walk on the Spanish Coat of Arms, so he inlaid them in the floor on their edges.

Gallery

References

American slave traders
19th-century Cuban people
Spanish slave traders